Svetitsa is a rural locality (a selo) in Gorodetskoye Rural Settlement, Kichmengsko-Gorodetsky District, Vologda Oblast, Russia. The population was 44 as of 2002.

Geography 
Svetitsa is located 58 km northwest of Kichmengsky Gorodok (the district's administrative centre) by road. Sirino is the nearest rural locality.

References 

Rural localities in Kichmengsko-Gorodetsky District